Aquaria (styled as AQUΛRIA) is the debut studio album by American record producer, singer-songwriter, rapper and musician Boots.
In the United States, the album has charted at number 14 on the Billboard Top Heatseekers chart.

Background
Boots came to worldwide attention in December 2013 when Beyoncé released her highly successful fifth studio album Beyoncé, for which BOOTS had written and produced several songs, including "Haunted", "Heaven" and "Blue".
In May 2014, he released a mixtape titled WinterSpringSummerFall.
In early 2015, he released a five-song EP Motorcycle Jesus, which served as a soundtrack album for a short film of the same title, directed by BOOTS.
The release of his debut studio album Aquaria was announced by Columbia Records in a press release on August 20, 2015.

Critical reception

Aquaria has received generally favorable reviews from music critics. At Metacritic, which assigns a normalised rating out of 100 to reviews from mainstream critics, the album received an average score of 68, based on 17 reviews.

Track listing

Personnel
Credits adapted from AllMusic

Musicians
 Boots – vocals, bass, clapping, drums, farfisa organ, guitar, juno, Korg M1, mouth bass, piano, timpani, toms
 Carla Azar – drums
 Matt Barrick – claves, djembe, drums, juno, toms
 Nick Brown – drums
 Anthony Coleman – horn
 Haley Dekle – vocals, background vocals
 Deradoorian – vocals
 Jason Disu – horn
 El-P – drums, synthesizer
 Kirby Lauryen – background vocals
 Roger Joseph Manning, Jr. – Jupiter
 Gabe Wax – electronics, guitar, moog synthesizer, synthesizer

Technical personnel
 Boots – drum programming, engineering, mixing, production
 Carla Azar – additional production
 Matt Barrick – additional production
 Mario Borgatta – mixing assistant
 Martin Cook – assistant engineer
 Rich Costey – mixing
 El-P – additional production, engineering, production
 Florian Etien – engineering
 Nicolas Fournier – assistant engineer
 Elliot Lee Hazel – photography
 Joe LaPorta – mastering
 Gabe Wax – additional production, production
 Stuart White – additional production, mixing

Charts

References

2015 debut albums
Boots (musician) albums
Columbia Records albums